Geoffrey Charles Lester Lunt  (1885–1948) was an Anglican bishop in the 20th century.

Early life and education
Born into an ecclesiastical family Lunt was educated at Sherborne and Exeter College, Oxford and ordained in 1909. His first post was as curate at Christ Church, Clifton, Bristol, after which he was secretary of the Church Missionary Society for Public Schools and Young People's Work then Vicar of St Paul's, Bedminster.

Military service
While at Bedminster, Lunt was freed to join the Army Chaplain's Department and served in France and Flanders with the 17th Division on a one-year contract. He experienced the Battles of Arras and Passchendaele, witnessed cavalry attacks, bombardments and the effects of gas and helped with surgical operations, soup kitchens and mass burials. He was awarded the Military Cross (MC) for rescuing wounded soldiers.

Later ecclesiastical career
When peace returned, Lunt became Vicar of All Saints, Northampton then Archdeacon of Egypt. From 1928 he was Vicar of St Mary's, Portsea, Portsmouth, the largest parish of the city, before his appointment to the episcopate as Bishop of Ripon in 1935.

By 1946, Lunt's health was causing concern, and when the Bishop of Southwark turned down the offer of translation to Salisbury, Lunt was offered the post and accepted it. A rural diocese seemed to provide a more amenable setting than Ripon which included the city of Leeds. Unfortunately, Lunt's health did not improve and he died in 1948.

Marriage and children
Lunt was married to Lillias M Sherbrooke (1889-1980)  Their son Ronald Geoffrey Lunt (1913-1994) was also a war chaplain who served with 7th commando in Libya; and later the rector of Martley.  Their daughter Norah Elisetta Lunt married Norman Tubbs in 1918.  Tubbs was successively Bishop of Tinnevelly, Bishop of Rangoon, Archdeacon of Chester (and Assistant Bishop of Chester) and Dean of Chester.

Lunt's brother was Theodore Robert Woosnam Lunt (1879-1951).

Lunt's sister Mary Baskerville Lunt married Hugh Cecil Jenner (1872-1968) who was descended from Francis Lascelles (1744-1799) and the singer Ann Catley.

References

External links

1885 births
1948 deaths
Alumni of Exeter College, Oxford
Anglican archdeacons in Africa
Bishops of Ripon (modern diocese)
Bishops of Salisbury
People educated at Sherborne School
Recipients of the Military Cross
Royal Army Chaplains' Department officers
World War I chaplains
20th-century Church of England bishops